The San Jose State Spartans college football team represent San Jose State University in the Mountain West Conference. The Spartans competed in the National Collegiate Athletic Association (NCAA) College Division in the years 1921–1968. In 1969, the team moved to National Collegiate Athletic Association (NCAA) Division I.

The program has had 29 different head coaches in its 99 seasons of existence (through 2016), including one who had multiple tenures as coach.

Coaches

References

San Jose State Spartans

San Jose State Spartans football